Cymatonycha castanea is a species of beetle in the family Cerambycidae. It was described by Bates in 1874. It is known to be from Costa Rica, Honduras, and Guatemala.

References

Desmiphorini
Beetles described in 1874